Trulli Tales, fully known as Trulli Tales: The Adventures of Trullalleri, is an animated children's television series created by Maria Elena and Fiorella Congedo. The series first premiered on October 17, 2017 on Gloobinho in Brazil. The series was produced by Fandango TV, Congedo CulturArte, Gaumont Animation, Groupe PVP, and Rai Fiction with the participation of the Canada Media Fund, the collaboration of Radio-Canada and produced in association with The Walt Disney Company EMEA.

Set in the fictional world of Trullalleri or Trulliland (which is meant to resemble Alberobello), the series revolves around four children and one teacher who learn how to cook from their Grandma Trulli's cookbook from the past. But when Copperpot tries to steal it, the four children; Ring, Zip, Stella, and Sun, must stop him with the magical power from their wands.

Characters

Main 
 Ring (voiced by Eleanor Noble) is the talented leader of the group. He is a generous and kind friend, but can also be a little self-confident and vain. He is good at cooking and is the one in the group who selects the ingredients for each recipe. His wand is a fork and also a magnet, which is able to attract objects. He has brown hair, dark eyes, dressed in red.
 Zip (voiced by Sonja Ball) is the sportsman of the group. He is nice and funny, but sometimes he proves to be moody and impatient. He deals with mincing, blending, and cutting the ingredients selected by Ring. His wand is a kitchen whisk that can create wind. He has orange hair and green eyes and dressed in blue.
 Stella (voiced by Sonja Ball) is the most vaporous of the group. Although at many times she is quite inattentive, distracted, careless, childish, and naive, she can be good-natured, kind, sensitive, polite, and sweet. She is talented in decorating, as shown by her ability to decorate the dishes. Her wand is a spatula that she uses to decorate the food made by her and her friends. She has brown hair, brown eyes, dressed in yellow.
 Sun (voiced by Holly Gauthier-Frankel) is the first of the group's class. She is very determined, intelligent, and brilliant, but can be touchy and stubborn. She takes care of cooking the dishes in the group. Her wand is a spoon, which she uses to control temperatures. She has amber hair and blue eyes and is dressed in pink.
 Miss Frisella  (voiced by Eleanor Noble) is the owner of the Trulli Kingdom bakery and keeper of the Magic Cookbook
 Trulli Grandma (voiced by Sonja Ball) is the creator of the Magic Cookbook and would guide the kids through riddles that would help them solve any of their problems.

Villains 
 Copperpot (voiced by Richard M. Dumont) is the main villain who always tries to steal the Magic cookbook. He would always brag about being a genius. It is revealed in I Want to Bread Free that he wants the Magic Cookbook to free his one of his ancestors Copperpan who is trapped inside.
 Athenina (voiced by Jennifer Seguin) is Copperpot's pet owl.

Recurring 
 Terry and Lu (voiced by Sonja Ball and Angela Galuppo) are a spider and snail that appear at the beginning and end of every episode.
 Trulli King (voiced by Terrence Scammell) is the ruler of Trulliland who has a collection of Donkey antiques

Production 
Trulli Tales is produced by Fandango TV, Congedo CulturArte, and Rai Fiction in Italy, Gaumont Animation in France, and Groupe PVP in Canada. Gaumont and Groupe formed a co-production agreement for this series, alongside Belle and Sebastian in 2015. The series was inspired by a book published by Congedo.

The show was commissioned by The Walt Disney Company for its Disney Junior channels in the EMEA regions, alongside Rai Fiction for Rai YoYo in Italy, Ici Radio-Canada Télé in Canada, and Globosat's Gloobinho in Brazil. Boat Rocker Media represents the property for consumer products in the United Kingdom.

Episodes 

Every episode of the series was directed by Eric Gosselet.

Broadcast 
Trulli Tales debuted October 17, 2017 on Gloobinho in Brazil. The series premiered on December 11, 2017 on Disney Junior in Italy, and later June 11, 2018 on Rai YoYo. In Canada, the series premiered on Ici Radio-Canada Télé on January 6, 2018, and on Knowledge Network on May 7, 2018.

On December 11, 2017, the series debuted across many Disney Junior channels in the EMEA area, including France and the UK and Ireland. The series also premiered in the latter on Tiny Pop on January 21, 2019. In South Africa, the series premiered on February 26, 2018. In Singapore, the series premiered on Channel 5 on July 15, 2019. On October 5, the series premiered in the United States on Nick Jr. As of November 2019, the series had been sold to 177 territories globally.

Awards
Trulli Tales was awarded the Prix Gémeaux for best animated series in 2018. In 2019, it became the first television series to win the Italian Creativity Award from the Istituto Italiano di Cultura in the United States.

Merchandise
Giochi Preziosi launched a series of toys for the series in 2018, which were distributed in Italy and the United Kingdom. Additional merchandise was produced for Italian release, including educational toys, tissues, stickers, and food products. Panini began publishing an official magazine in November 2019.

References

External links
Official website 

2010s Canadian animated television series
2010s French animated television series
2010s animated television series
2017 Canadian television series debuts
2017 French television series debuts
2017 Italian television series debuts
2017 animated television series debuts
2019 Canadian television series endings
2019 French television series endings
2019 Italian television series endings
Canadian children's animated comic science fiction television series
Canadian children's animated action television series
Canadian children's animated science fantasy television series
Canadian flash animated television series
Canadian television shows based on children's books
French children's animated comic science fiction television series
French children's animated action television series
French children's animated science fantasy television series
French flash animated television series
French television shows based on children's books
Italian children's animated comic science fiction television series
Italian children's animated action television series
Italian children's animated science fantasy television series
Italian flash animated television series
English-language television shows
Disney Channel original programming
Disney Junior original programming
Nick Jr. original programming
Nickelodeon original programming
Rede Globo original programming
Television about magic
Television series by Boat Rocker Media
Animated television series about children